Yellow copper is a colloquial name for various minerals and alloys with high copper content:
 Chalcopyrite
 Brass